Aravampatti  is a village in the Gandharvakottai block revenue block of Pudukkottai district, Tamil Nadu, India.

Demographics 
As per the 2001 census, Aravampatti had a total population of 1038 with 529 males and 509 females. Out of the total population 545 people were literate.

References

Villages in Pudukkottai district